The South Atlantic is the portion of the Atlantic Ocean which lies south of the Equator.

South Atlantic may also refer to:

 South Atlantic (magazine), an American magazine from 1877-1882
 South Atlantic Anomaly, where the inner Van Allen belt island closest to the Earth's surface
 South Atlantic Autonomous Region of Nicaragua, now the South Caribbean Coast Autonomous Region
 South Atlantic Blockading Squadron, see: Union blockade
 South Atlantic City, New Jersey, see: Margate City, New Jersey
 South Atlantic Coastal Plain, see: Atlantic coastal plain
 South Atlantic Conference, American college athletic conference
 South Atlantic convergence zone, elongated axis of clouds, precipitation and convergent winds
 South Atlantic Current, eastward flowing ocean current, fed by the Brazil Current
 South Atlantic elephant-seal, see: southern elephant seal
 South Atlantic English, variety of the English language spoken on islands in the South Atlantic Ocean
 South Atlantic Flash, see: Vela incident
 South Atlantic Football Association, see: Dixie League (football)
 South Atlantic High, semipermanent pressure high centred at about 25°S, 15°W
 South Atlantic Intercollegiate Athletic Association, former American intercollegiate athletic conference
 South Atlantic Intercollegiate Sailing Association, district in the American Intercollegiate Sailing Association
 South Atlantic Invasive Species Project, three-year project (2006–2009) funded under the European Union EDF 9
 South Atlantic Investment Corporation Building, historic site in Jacksonville, Florida, United States
 South Atlantic League, or "Sally League", American baseball league
 South Atlantic Medal, campaign medal awarded to British military personnel and civilians for service in the 1982 Falklands War
 South Atlantic Peace and Cooperation Zone, created in 1986 through a UN resolution on Brazil's initiative
 South Atlantic Petroleum, Nigerian oil and gas exploration and production company
 South Atlantic Race, yacht race from Cape Town to various destinations in South America
 South Atlantic Squadron, component of the US Navy until the early 1900s
 South Atlantic States, one of nine American Census Bureau Divisions
 South Atlantic Station, former operational area of the British Royal Navy
 South Atlantic tropical cyclone, unusual weather event originating in the South Atlantic Ocean
 South Atlantic War, see Falklands War